was a Japanese football player. He played for Japan national team.

Club career
Teshima was born in Hiroshima Prefecture on February 26, 1907. He played for Tokyo OB Club and won 1933 Emperor's Cup with Shigemaru Takenokoshi and Teiichi Matsumaru.

National team career
In May 1930, when Teshima was a Tokyo Imperial University student, he was selected Japan national team for 1930 Far Eastern Championship Games in Tokyo and Japan won the championship. At this competition, on May 25, he debuted and scored a goal against Philippines. On May 29, he also played and scored a goal against Republic of China. He played 2 games and scored 2 goals for Japan in 1930.

After retirement
After graduating from Tokyo Imperial University, Teshima retired playing career and joined Ministry of Agriculture and Forestry. In 1940, he joined Tanabe Pharmaceutical and helps develop the club.

Teshima died on November 6, 1982 at the age of 75. In 2008, he was selected Japan Football Hall of Fame.

National team statistics

References

External links
 
 Japan National Football Team Database
Japan Football Hall of Fame at Japan Football Association

1907 births
1982 deaths
University of Tokyo alumni
Association football people from Hiroshima Prefecture
Japanese footballers
Japan international footballers
Association football forwards